Richard Godson, QC (1797–1849) was an English barrister and politician. His father was William Godson of Worcester who died in 1822. His brothers were Septimus Holmes Godson, barrister, and Stephen Godson, attorney. Godson's relationship with Kidderminster began when he defended carpet-weavers on trial there in 1830. In 1835, following the abolition of slavery, Godson received compensation for enslaved persons associated with the Pusey Hall Estate in Jamaica. He had declared this "embarrassment" openly while campaigning, during which time he supported both the First Reform Bill and emancipation.

References 

Members of the Parliament of the United Kingdom for English constituencies
St Albans
Kidderminster
1797 births
1849 deaths
Richard
UK MPs 1831–1832
UK MPs 1832–1835
UK MPs 1837–1841
UK MPs 1841–1847
UK MPs 1847–1852
British slave owners
English King's Counsel